João Pirez was a Portuguese nobleman. The Island of Pory (Elephanta Island) in Bombay was leased to João Pirez in 1548 by viceroy João de Castro. The rent to be paid was 105 pardaos.

References
Origin of Bombay, p. 21

History of Mumbai
16th-century Portuguese people